The 2022 Georgia State Panthers football team represented Georgia State University as a member of the Sun Belt Conference during the 2022 NCAA Division I FBS football season. The Panthers were led by sixth-year head coach Shawn Elliott and played their home games at Center Parc Stadium in Atlanta.

Previous season

The Panthers finished the 2021 season with an 8–5 overall record and 6–2 in Sun Belt play. The Panthers won the 2021 Camellia Bowl 51–20 over Ball State.

Preseason

Media poll
The Sun Belt media days were held on July 25 and July 26. The Panthers were predicted to finish in third place in the Sun Belt's East Division. Georgia State also received 1-of-14 first place votes.

Sun Belt Preseason All-Conference teams

Offense

1st team
Malik Sumter – Offensive Lineman, RS-SR

2nd team
Tucker Gregg – Running Back, SR
Travis Glover – Offensive Lineman, RS-SR
Pat Bartlett – Offensive Lineman, RS-SR
Aubry Payne – Offensive Lineman, RS-SR

Defense

1st team
Blake Carroll – Linebacker, SR
Antavious Lane – Defensive Back, RS-JR

2nd team
Thomas Gore – Defensive Lineman, RS-JR

Schedule

Game summaries

at South Carolina

North Carolina
North Carolina became the first Power Five team ever to visit Georgia State.

Charlotte

Coastal Carolina

at Army

Georgia Southern

at Appalachian State

Old Dominion

at Southern Miss

Louisiana–Monroe

at James Madison

at Marshall

References

Georgia State
Georgia State Panthers football seasons
Georgia State Panthers football